The Swedish Women's Educational Association, referred to as SWEA but officially designated SWEA International, Inc., is a global non-profit organization and a network for Swedish and Swedish-speaking women who reside or have resided outside of Sweden.

SWEA is represented in many locations throughout the world and plays a major role in the Swedish State Department's emergency management plan.

SWEA is a politically and religiously independent organization.

Organization 
SWEA International is the largest non-profit organization promoting Sweden outside of Sweden with the goal of promoting the Swedish language and spreading Swedish culture and tradition.

Each year, SWEA International awards three scholarships of US$10,000 each:
 The Scholarship for Research Related to the Swedish Language, Literature, and Society
 The Agneta and Gunnar Nilsson Scholarship for the Study of Intercultural Relations
 The Sigrid Paskell Scholarship in the Performing Arts
In addition, SWEA International selects a Swedish Woman of the Year annually.

Locally, SWEA International's chapters make donations and present scholarships that total about 2 million Swedish kronor (US$250,000) per year.

SWEA International provides members with support as they relocate and move between countries, as well as welcoming and supporting members when they return to Sweden.

SWEA International has approximately 7,000 women members in approximately 70 local chapters in about 30 countries on five continents.

SWEA International's chairman since 2016 is Christina Hallmert.

History 
In 1979, SWEA International was founded in Los Angeles by Agneta Nilsson. Princess Christina Mrs. Magnuson is the association's honorary president.

Swedish Woman of the Year 
Since 1989, SWEA International has selected a Swedish Woman of the Year (abbreviated ÅSK, for Årets Svenska Kvinna) annually. The recipient is announced during SWEA's annual meeting each spring and is recognized during the annual "Sweden dinner" organized each summer by one of the chapters located in Sweden. The recipient must be a Swedish woman who, through her accomplishments, has represented and brought attention to the Sweden of today in the greater world.

The following women have been recognized as Swedish Woman of the Year:
 1989: Ulla Wachtmeister
 1990: Birgitta Wistrand
 1991, 1992: Undistributed
 1993: Anne-Marie De Geer and Ingrid Croneborg-Bergman
 1994: Lise-Lotte Lübeck-Erixon
 1995: Ingrid Karlsson
 1996: Undistributed
 1997: Ulla-Brita Palm
 1998: Dorothea Rosenblad
 1999: Kerstin Nordquist-Lane
2000: Maria Nyström Reuterswärd
2001: Drottning Silvia
2002: Eva Olofsson
2003: Ewa Kumlin
2004: Barbro Sachs-Osher
2005: Ingrid le Roux
2006: Tina Nordström
2007: Marianne Forssblad
2008: Inger Schuberth
2009: Agneta Nilsson, founder of SWEA International, Inc.
2010: Kjerstin Dellert
2011: Christina Lampe Önnerud
2012: Filippa Knutsson
2013: Mona Henning
2014: Nina Stemme
2015: Petra Wadström
2016: Maria Strømme
2017: Nikoo Bazsefidpay
2018: Ulrika Hydman Vallien
2019: Greta Thunberg

Sources

External links 
SWEA, SWEA International's website

Women's organizations based in Sweden
Charities based in Sweden